Acalolepta flocculata is a species of beetle in the family Cerambycidae. It was described by Gressitt in 1935. It is known from Taiwan and China.

Subspecies
 Acalolepta flocculata flocculata (Gressitt, 1935)
 Acalolepta flocculata paucisetosa (Gressitt, 1938)

References

Acalolepta
Beetles described in 1935